Afonino is a rural locality (a selo) in Novodrachyoninsky Selsoviet, Zarinsky District, Altai Krai, Russia. The population was 178 as of 2013. There are 5 streets.

Geography 
Afonino is located 44 km northeast of Zarinsk (the district's administrative centre) by road. Zmaznevo is the nearest rural locality.

References 

Rural localities in Zarinsky District